Tolliella fulguritella is a moth of the family Cosmopterigidae. It is found in Asia Minor and the Near East (Turkey, Lebanon, Syria, Jordan and Iraq).

The wingspan is 17–25 mm. Adults have been recorded in July.

References

Moths described in 1895
Cosmopteriginae
Insects of Turkey